Ali Abdosh Mohammed (Amharic: አሊ አብዶሽ; born 25 August 1987) is an Ethiopian long-distance runner who specializes in the 5000 metres, cross-country running and road running.

He won the bronze medal at the 2008 African Championships, finished sixth at the 2009 World Championships and twelfth at the 2009 World Athletics Final.

International competitions

Personal bests

 5000 metres: 12:56.53 min, 4 September 2009, Brussels
 10,000 metres: 27:04.92 min, 26 May 2007, Hengelo
 10K run: 28:21 min, 24 June 2012,	Boston
 Marathon: 2:12:55 h, 3 January 2015, Xiamen

External links 

 
 Profile at ARRS

1987 births
Living people
Ethiopian male long-distance runners
Athletes (track and field) at the 2007 All-Africa Games
Athletes (track and field) at the 2011 All-Africa Games
African Games competitors for Ethiopia
21st-century Ethiopian people